IRGC may refer to:

 Islamic Revolutionary Guard Corps, Iran
 IRGC (gene), a gene in humans
 International Risk Governance Council, a foundation in Switzerland